Gerhard "Gad" Beck (30 June 1923 – 24 June 2012) was an Israeli-German educator, author, activist, resistance member, and survivor of the Holocaust.

Life and career
Gad Beck was born Gerhard Beck in Berlin, Germany, along with twin sister Margot, the son of Hedwig (née Kretschmar) and Heinrich Beck. His father was born Jewish, and his German mother, originally a Protestant, had converted to Judaism. The family lived in a predominantly Jewish immigrant section of the city. At age five, he and his family moved to the Weissensee district where he attended primary school and was the target of antisemitism from classmates. In 1934, he was enrolled in a Jewish school but had to quit and take a job as a shop attendant.

As a person of partial Jewish ancestry (a Mischling in Nazi terminology), Beck was not deported with other German Jews. Instead, he remained in Berlin. He recalls in his autobiography borrowing a neighbor's Hitler Youth uniform and marching in 1942 into the pre-deportation camp where his lover, Manfred Lewin, had been arrested and detained. He asked the commanding officer for the young man's release for use in a construction project, and it was granted. When outside the building, however, Lewin declined, saying, "Gad, I can't go with you. My family needs me. If I abandon them now, I could never be free." With that, the two parted without saying goodbye. "In those seconds, watching him go," Gad recalls, "I grew up." Lewin and his entire family were murdered at Auschwitz.

Gad Beck joined an underground effort to supply food and hiding places to Jews escaping to neutral Switzerland. In early 1945, a Jewish spy for the Gestapo betrayed him and some of his underground friends. He was subsequently interrogated and interned in a Jewish transit camp in Berlin. His parents and sister did survive the war, thanks to help from their Christian relatives on his mother's side.

After World War II, Beck helped organize efforts to enable Jewish survivors to emigrate to Israel, emigrating himself in 1947.

In the late 1970s, Beck met Julius Laufer. Eventually Laufer joined him in Israel, and the two were together for 35 years.

Beck returned to Berlin in 1979 where he was the director of the Jewish Adult Education Center in Berlin.

In 2000, Beck was featured, along with a few other gay Holocaust survivors, in the HBO documentary film Paragraph 175 in which he remembers his "great, great love" lost to the Nazis. Also in 2000, the English translation of Beck's 1995 autobiography, An Underground Life: Memoirs of a Gay Jew in Nazi Berlin, was published, leading to a successful book tour through the United States.

A documentary film on his life was proposed but never released.

Beck passed away from kidney failure at age 88, survived by his partner Laufer.

Death
Beck died on 24 June 2012, in a Berlin retirement home at the age of 88.

See also
German Jews
Homosexuality in Germany
Persecution of homosexuals in Nazi Germany and the Holocaust
Pierre Seel
Albrecht Becker
Heinz Dörmer
Karl Gorath
Wilhelm Heckmann
Kurt von Ruffin
Friedrich-Paul von Groszheim

References

1923 births
2012 deaths
German gay writers
Jewish concentration camp survivors
Gay Jews
20th-century German Jews
German emigrants to Israel
Jews in the German resistance
German autobiographers
Writers from Berlin
LGBT educators